Chinese hickory is a common name for several plants and may refer to:

Annamocarya sinensis, native to southwestern China and northern Vietnam
Carya cathayensis